Divine law is any body of law that is perceived as deriving from a transcendent source, such as the will of God or godsin contrast to man-made law or to secular law. According to Angelos Chaniotis and Rudolph F. Peters, divine laws are typically perceived as superior to man-made laws, sometimes due to an assumption that their source has resources beyond human knowledge and human reason. Believers in divine laws might accord them greater authority than other laws, for example by assuming that divine law cannot be changed by human authorities.

According to Chaniotis, Divine laws are noted for their apparent inflexibility. The introduction of interpretation into divine law is a controversial issue, since believers place high significance on adhering to the law precisely. Opponents to the application of divine law typically deny that it is purely divine and point out human influences in the law. These opponents characterize such laws as belonging to a particular cultural tradition. Conversely, adherents of divine law are sometimes reluctant to adapt inflexible divine laws to cultural contexts.

Medieval Christianity assumed the existence of three kinds of laws: divine law, natural law, and man-made law. Theologians have substantially debated the scope of natural law, with the Enlightenment encouraging greater use of reason and expanding the scope of natural law and marginalizing divine law in a process of secularization.
Since the authority of divine law is rooted in its source, the origins and transmission-history of divine law are important.

Conflicts frequently arise between secular understandings of justice or morality and divine law.

Religious law, such as canon law, includes both divine law and additional interpretations, logical extensions, and traditions.

See also
 Biblical law in Christianity
 Dharma
 Halakha
 
 Law and religion
 Mitzvah
 Morality and religion
 Regulative principle of worship, debate over the scope of divine law in 17th-century English Christian practices
 Rule according to higher law
 Sharia, Islamic law
 Ten Commandments
 Theocracy

Notes

Citations

References

Further reading 

 Canosa, J. (2009). The Efficacy of the Divine Law in the Administrative Justice in the Church. Ius Canonicum, 49, 549. https://heinonline.org/HOL/P?h=hein.journals/iuscan49&i=555
 
 McCall, B. M. (2011). Consulting the Architect When Problems Arise-The Divine Law. Geo. JL & Pub. Pol'y, 9, 103.
 Rubin, A. P. (1992). International Law in the age of Columbus. Netherlands International Law Review, 39(1), 5-35.
 Rumble, W. E. (1979). Divine Law, Utilitarian Ethics, and Positivist Jurisprudence: A Study of the Legal Philosophy of John Austin. Am. J. Juris., 24, 139.

External links

 Catholic Encyclopedia: Moral Aspect of Divine Law

Christian terminology
Philosophy of law
Religious ethics
Religious law
Theories of law